The 15th Pan American Games were held in Rio de Janeiro, Brazil from 13 July to 29 July 2007.

See also
 Saint Vincent and the Grenadines at the 2008 Summer Olympics

External links
Rio 2007 Official website

Nations at the 2007 Pan American Games
Pan American Games
2007